"" is a song by Swiss rapper Loredana and Kosovo-Albanian rapper Mozzik from their collaborative studio album No Rich Parents (2021). The song was written by Loredana, Mozzik, Saru, Selmon, Smajl Shaqiri, Takt and Vito, and produced by Loredana, Mozzik and Jumpa. It was independently released as the lead single for digital download and streaming on 28 May 2021. The lyrics of the Albanian and German-language song attempt to elaborate their separation and seek to find answers to the questions of why it had come so far. "" was well received by music critics, some of whom praised its music and lyrics. The single was a commercial success in  German-speaking Europe, reaching number one in Germany, as well as the top five in Austria and Switzerland. The accompanying music video was directed by Fati.tv and Haris Dubica, being released along with the song. It features scenes during Loredana and Mozzik's time together as a couple and re-enacted shots from their separation and reunion.

Background and composition 

In 2019, Loredana and Mozzik announced their separation, approximately a year after the birth of their daughter Hana. Prior to the release of "" in May 2021, a social media post by Loredana featuring her with a newborn child in her arms sparked rumors that the couple had reunited and married for a second time. The latter themes were addressed during the song's Albanian and German-language lyrics, wherein, both attempt to elaborate their separation and seek to find answers to the questions of why it had come so far. "" was written by Loredana, Mozzik, Saru, Selmon, Smajl Shaqiri, Takt and Vito, while the production was handled by Jumpa, Loredana and Mozzik. The song was independently released for digital download and streaming on 28 May 2021 as the lead single from their collaborative studio album No Rich Parents (2021).

Reception and promotion 

"" was met with generally positive reviews from music critics. Swiss website Lyrics Magazin found the song "perfectly" backed by a "theatrical beat", which with the use of a vocal sample and an acoustic guitar, brought out the emotions even more. Mira Weingart from Red Bull described it as "emotional" and very "personal". "" attained commercial success in German-speaking Europe. The single topped the Official German Charts in June 2021, and also reached the top five in Austria and Switzerland, respectively.

An accompanying music video for "" was uploaded to Mozzik's official YouTube channel simultaneously with the single's release on 28 May 2021. The video was directed by Fati.tv and Haris Dubica and produced by Luka Katic and Nancho by Fati.tv. It features scenes of Loredana and Mozzik during their time together as a couple, including reenacted shots from their separation and reunion as well as the birth of their daughter. During Loredana's Red Bull Symphonic concert in November 2021, the single was presented in an orchestral version, which was labelled by Martin Seebacher, as a "banger".

Credits and personnel 
Credits adapted from Spotify and Tidal.

Loredanaproducing, songwriting, vocals
Mozzik (Gramoz Aliu)producing, songwriting, vocals
Jumpasongwriting, producing
Sarusongwriting
Selmonsongwriting
Smajl Shaqirisongwriting
Taktsongwriting
Vitosongwriting
Koen Heldensmixing, mastering

Charts

See also 
List of number-one hits of 2021 (Germany)

References 

2021 singles
2021 songs
Loredana Zefi songs
Mozzik songs
Albanian-language songs
German-language songs
Music videos directed by Fati.tv
Number-one singles in Germany
Song recordings produced by Jumpa
Songs written by Loredana Zefi